Diane Borg (born 12 September 1990 in Pietà, Malta) is a Maltese sprinter.  She competed in the 100 metres competition at the 2012 Summer Olympics; she ran the preliminaries in 12.00 seconds, qualifying her for Round 1, and Round 1 in 11.92 seconds, which did not qualify her for the semifinals.

At the 2014 Commonwealth Games, she competed in the 100 m, 200 m and  relay, running a season's best in the 200 m.

References

External links
 

1990 births
Living people
Maltese female sprinters
Olympic athletes of Malta
Athletes (track and field) at the 2012 Summer Olympics
Athletes (track and field) at the 2014 Commonwealth Games
Commonwealth Games competitors for Malta
World Athletics Championships athletes for Malta
People from Pietà, Malta
Olympic female sprinters